One Sutton Place South is a 14-story, 42-unit cooperative apartment house in the East Midtown neighborhood of Manhattan, New York City, overlooking the East River on Sutton Place between 56th and 57th Streets. One Sutton Place South contains the residences of diplomats, titans of industry, and media executives.

History
The building was designed and completed in 1927 by Rosario Candela and Cross and Cross for the Phipps family. 

When her son, Winston Guest, the polo player and husband of garden columnist C. Z. Guest, took the apartment over, the lower floor was subdivided into three separate apartments, one of which was occupied by designer Bill Blass. The Guests lived on one side of the penthouse and one of their sons, Alexander, lived on the other side for several years. The Guests sold the apartment in 1963 about the time that their daughter, socialite Cornelia Guest, was born. The apartment was then acquired by Janet Annenberg Hooker, the philanthropist who died in late 1997 and was a sister of Walter Annenberg, the communications magnate and art collector. The apartment was put on the market in early 1998.

Property dispute
A portion of the property behind One Sutton Place South was the subject of a dispute between the building's owners and the New York City Department of Parks and Recreation. Like the adjacent park, part of the rear garden at One Sutton Place South is cantilevered over the FDR Drive, a busy expressway at Manhattan's eastern edge that is not visible from most of Sutton Place. In 1939, city authorities took ownership of the property behind One Sutton Place South by condemnation in connection with the construction of the FDR Drive, then leased it back to the building. The building's lease for its backyard expired in 1990. The co-op tried unsuccessfully to extend the lease, and later made prospective apartment-buyers review the legal status of the backyard and sign a confidentiality agreement. The question of ownership came to a head in 2003 when the state's Department of Transportation began rehabilitation of FDR Drive between 54th and 63rd Streets and threatened to tear up the garden to fix the deck. In June 2007, the co-op sued the city in an attempt the keep the land, and on November 1, 2011, the co-op and the city reached an agreement in which the co-op ended its ownership claim to a smaller section of land sitting atop the deck only, with each side contributing $1 million toward the creation of a public park on the disputed portion.

Residents
Residents have included John Fairchild, publisher of Women’s Wear Daily; and actress Sigourney Weaver.

References

External links 
 StreetEasy.com Building Info
 CityRealty.com Profile

1927 establishments in New York City
Midtown Manhattan
Residential buildings completed in 1927
1 Sutton Place South
Rosario Candela buildings